Trecella railway station is a railway station in Italy. Located on the Milan–Venice railway, it serves the hamlet of Trecella, in the municipality of Pozzuolo Martesana.

Services
Trecella is served by lines S5 and S6 of Milan suburban railway network, operated by the Lombard railway company Trenord.

See also
Milan suburban railway network

References

External links

Railway stations in Lombardy
Milan S Lines stations